Gonyosoma prasinum (green trinket snake, green bush rat snake or  green ratsnake)  is a species of colubrid snake found in Asia.

Description
Rostral a little broader than deep, just visible from above; suture between the internasals a little shorter than that between the prefrontals; frontal as long as its distance from the end of the snout, shorter than the parietals; loreal square or longer than deep; one or two preoculars; temporals 1+2 or 2+2; upper labials 9, fourth, fifth, and sixth entering the eye; 5 lower labials in contact with the anterior chin-shields, which are as long as the posterior or a little longer. Scales in 19 rows, the 9 to 11 middle rows feebly keeled m the adult, smooth in the young. Ventrals with a lateral keel, 198 to 206; anal entire or divided; subcaudals 100–107. Uniform bright green above; upper lip and lower surface yellowish or greenish white. Total length 3 feet: tail 9 inches.

Distribution
Its habitat ranges include Bangladesh, India (Darjeeling, Assam, Arunachal Pradesh, Myanmar, northern Thailand, western Malaysia, Laos, Viet Nam, China (Yunnan, Guizhou and Hainan) and Philippines.

Notes

References
 Blyth, EDWARD. 1855 Notices and descriptions of various reptiles, new or little known [part 2]. Jour. Asiatic Soc. Bengal, Calcutta, 23 (3): 287-302 [1854]
 Boulenger, George A. 1894 Catalogue of the Snakes in the British Museum (Natural History). Volume II., Containing the Conclusion of the Colubridæ Aglyphæ. British Mus. (Nat. Hist.), London, xi, 382 pp.
 Das, I. 1999 Biogeography of the amphibians and reptiles of the Andaman and Nicobar Islands, India. In: Ota, H. (ed) Tropical Island herpetofauna.., Elsevier, pp. 43–77
 Grossmann, W. 2002 Elaphe prasina (Blyth). Sauria (Suppl.) 24 (3): 573-576
 Schulz, Klaus-Dieter 1996 A monograph of the colubrid snakes of the genus Elaphe Fitzinger. Koeltz Scientific Books, 439 pp.
 Utiger, Urs, Notker Helfenberger, Beat Schätti, Catherine Schmidt, Markus Ruf and Vincent Ziswiler 2002 Molecular systematics and phylogeny of Old World and New World ratsnakes, Elaphe Auct., and related genera (Reptilia, Squamata, Colubridae). Russ. J. Herpetol. 9 (2): 105–124.
 The Catalogue of Life (https://web.archive.org/web/20160308192308/http://www.catalogueoflife.org/col/details/species/id/13209369 ).
 The Toxicology Centre (https://web.archive.org/web/20150907064759/http://www.toxicologycentre.com/English/snakesofindia/greentrinketsnake.html%29%7B%7B%7B%7Bunreliable

Rat snakes
Reptiles described in 1854
Taxa named by Edward Blyth
Reptiles of Bangladesh
Reptiles of India
Reptiles of Thailand
Reptiles of Laos